"Dear Boy" is a song from the Paul McCartney album Ram. Credited to Paul and Linda McCartney, the song was written during the couple's lengthy holiday on their farm in the Mull of Kintyre. The lyrics were written by Paul about how lucky he was to have Linda.

Background
"Dear Boy" was written as an autobiographical song about his relationship with his wife, Linda. He says in a 1971 interview,

"Dear Boy" was also written as a message to Linda McCartney's ex-husband. In the 2012 RAM Special Edition Documentary, McCartney describes the song as written about Linda's former husband, Joseph Melville See Jr., and the things he hadn't seen in her. He said on the topic in 2001,

McCartney's former partner John Lennon, however, thought that the song was about him. Certain lines such as "She was just the cutest thing around" could have referred to McCartney as being the cute Beatle. He may have changed the gender to conceal his identity and Lennon mentioned in subsequent interviews that the Ram album had subtle allusions to himself and Yoko Ono. Since then, however, McCartney has said that the song was not about Lennon.

Personnel
Paul McCartney – lead vocals, electric guitar, bass guitar, piano, percussion
Linda McCartney – backing vocals
David Spinozza/Hugh McCracken – guitar
Denny Seiwell – drums, percussion
Paul Beaver, Philip Davis – synthesizers
Jim Guercio – backing vocals

References

Paul McCartney songs
Songs written by Paul McCartney
Songs written by Linda McCartney
Music published by MPL Music Publishing
1971 songs